The United Presbyterian Church of Canehill is a historic church on Main Street in Canehill, Arkansas.  Built in 1891, it is the only surviving church building in the small community.  It is a brick structure with a cruciform plan with steeply-pitched gable roofs, large Gothic-arched stained glass windows, and a tower with an octagonal belfry topped by a shingled steeple.  Canehill was originally settled in 1828 by a Presbyterian group, and eventually supported three separate Presbyterian congregations over the course of the 19th century.  These congregations were reunited into this building in 1905.

The building was listed on the National Register of Historic Places in 1982.

Renovation
In 2019, Historic Cane Hill Inc, a local historic preservation non-profit organization, entered a purchase/use agreement with the church. The agreement included a million-dollar renovation to original appearance, including restoring the pine woodwork's oak graining and original light fixtures. The 14 stained glass windows were cleaned and protected from the elements with clear glass. Workers discovered an original window with gothic arch and the original oak doors.

See also
National Register of Historic Places listings in Washington County, Arkansas

References

Presbyterian churches in Arkansas
Churches on the National Register of Historic Places in Arkansas
Gothic Revival church buildings in Arkansas
Churches completed in 1891
Churches in Washington County, Arkansas
National Register of Historic Places in Washington County, Arkansas
1891 establishments in Arkansas